Lataro (alternate names: Litaro or Satoshi Island or Pilot Island) is an uninhabited island in Sanma Province of Vanuatu in the Pacific Ocean.

The Shark Bay language is spoken in the regions surrounding the island.

Geography
Lataro lies in Shark Bay off the eastern coast of Espiritu Santo and is flat. The highest point of the island is 88 meters above the sea level. The island spans 1.9 km from the north to the south and 2.3 km from the east to the west.

History
The island has been leased by Anthony Welch since 2007 under a 75-year lease.

In 2022, Welch announced that he had unofficially renamed the island Satoshi in honor of Satoshi Nakamoto, the inventor of bitcoin and that the island would be turned into a home of bitcoin investors.

References

Islands of Vanuatu
Sanma Province
Uninhabited islands of Vanuatu